The 9th Asian Swimming Championships was held 15–25 November 2012 in Dubai, United Arab Emirates. It was the second time that Dubai hosted the Championships; the city previously hosted in 2004.  The 10th Asian Swimming Championships will be held in 2016 in Japan.

The Championships was organized by the Asia Swimming Federation (AASF), and in 2012 featured competition in 4 of the 5 Aquatics disciplines:
Swimming: 15–18 November (long course);
Synchronized Swimming: 15–18 November;
Water Polo: 19–25 November; and
Diving: 22–25 November.

Note: The AASF hosted a 2012 Championships in the fifth Aquatics discipline (Open Water), 21 October in Hong Kong.

Medalists

Swimming

Men's events

Women's events

Swimming Medal Table

Synchronized Swimming

Synchronized Swimming Medal Table

Diving

Diving medal table

Water Polo

Water Polo Medal Table

All Medal Table

References

External links 
 Results
 Diving Results
 All Diving Results 
 Waterpolo Results
 Waterpolo Matches 

Asian Championships